Mehdi Courgnaud (born 21 November 1990) is a French professional footballer who plays as a forward for Championnat National 3 club FC Montlouis.

Career
Courgnaud joined Dijon after beginning his career with hometown club Romorantin. He starred for his hometown for three seasons and had his best season in his final year with the club playing in the Championnat de France Amateur. He appeared in 26 league matches, scoring nine goals and issuing ten assists.

Following the campaign, Courgnaud was courted by several clubs in higher division, most notably Championnat National clubs Créteil and Orléans. However, in June 2010, it was announced by the media that Courgnaud had signed with second division club Dijon, alongside Sanaa Altama. Courgnaud began his career with Dijon playing on the club's reserve team. On 20 November 2010, a day before his 20th birthday, he made his professional debut in a Coupe de France match against amateur club Hayange. Courgnaud started the match and scored the fourth goal in an 8–0 victory.

References

External links 
 
 
 
 

1990 births
Living people
French footballers
Sportspeople from Loir-et-Cher
French sportspeople of Moroccan descent
Association football forwards
SO Romorantin players
Dijon FCO players
AC Arlésien players
RWS Bruxelles players
Avoine OCC players
Ligue 2 players
Ligue 1 players
Challenger Pro League players
Championnat National 3 players
French expatriate footballers
French expatriate sportspeople in Belgium
Expatriate footballers in Belgium
Footballers from Centre-Val de Loire